The 2022 season was Kedah Darul Aman's 14th season in the Malaysia Super League since the league's inception in 2004.

Management Team

Squad

Transfers and contracts

Transfers in
Pre-season

Mid-season

Note 1: Farhan Roslan left the club after returning from loan.

Loan in
Pre-season

Mid-season

Transfers out

Pre-season

Mid-season

Loan Out
Pre-season

Loan Return
Mid-season

Retained / Promoted

Friendlies

Pre-season

Tour of Klang Valley (4–9 February)

Tour of Sabah - SMJ Cup (10–19 February)

Others

Mid-season

Competitions

Malaysia Super League

Fixtures and results

 R = Rescheduled matches

League table

Malaysia FA Cup

Malaysia Cup

Round of 16

AFC Cup

Group stage

Knockout

Statistics

Appearances and goals
Players with no appearances not included in the list.

Notes

References 

Kedah Darul Aman F.C.
Kedah Darul Aman F.C. seasons
Kedah Darul Aman